The Cupra Born is a battery electric compact car/small family car (C-segment) marketed by SEAT through its performance-oriented Cupra marque. Initially unveiled as the SEAT el-Born concept in 2019, the production car was revealed in May 2021 as the Cupra Born. The Born is based on the Volkswagen Group MEB platform and has been manufactured at the same plant in Zwickau, Germany, as the MEB-based Volkswagen ID.3. The car is named after a neighbourhood in Barcelona, Catalonia, Spain.

Concept

The vehicle was previewed as the SEAT el-Born, which was unveiled in March 2019 Geneva Motor Show. The prototype car was fitted with a 62 kWh battery pack, with a claimed  range (WLTP). The battery was compatible with 100kW DC supercharging, and features a thermal management system. It featured driver assistance systems, and was capable of Level 2 Autonomous Driving.

Production version 

Production of the Born was confirmed in July 2020, and it is sold under the Cupra brand. The production car would have a larger battery pack than the prototype. The car was renamed to Cupra Born in February 2021, therefore dropping the "el-" from the name. It was expected to cost around £40,000, which is noted to be around the price of the higher end models of the Volkswagen ID.3.

The Born had its official premiere in May 2021.

It will have three battery capacities of 45 kWh for the weakest version and 55 kWh and 77 kWh for the most powerful model. The range will be from 340 to 540 kilometers (370 miles). Charging on a fast charger with up to 80% battery will take 35 minutes, and as Cupra announces, it will cover 100 kilometers in 7 minutes. The interior features a 12.0-inch touchscreen, sports seats with integrated headrests and a head-up display. Equipment also includes adaptive cruise control, Travel Assist system for semi-autonomous driving, traffic sign recognition, automatic braking system, Dynamic Chassis Control Sport suspension. Production started in September 2021.

References

External links 

 Official website

Born
el-Born
Cars introduced in 2020
Production electric cars
Rear-wheel-drive vehicles
Hot hatches